Rowan Eric Ramsey (born 4 August 1956) is the Liberal Party of Australia member for the House of Representatives seat of Grey since the 2007 election, succeeding previous Liberal member Barry Wakelin. Grey covers most of rural South Australia − over 92 percent of the state by area.

Ramsey is a member of the centre-right faction of the Liberal Party.

Nuclear industrial development 
In 2015 Ramsey commended the Government of South Australia for initiating the Nuclear Fuel Cycle Royal Commission. Commencing in March 2015, the Commission was tasked to investigate the opportunities and risk of further nuclear industrial development for South Australia, which includes mining, processing, power generation and waste management. He said of the decision:"I congratulate the Premier on this move; we simply cannot make sensible informed decisions about this industry if we don't talk about it."Ramsey supports the potential storage of low and intermediate level nuclear waste in his electorate of Grey. He intended to nominate his own property as a potential candidate site, but was advised not to by Minister Ian Macfarlane due to a perceived conflict of interest. He told the media:"I would be more than happy, for instance, to host it on my farm. But I wouldn't nominate my farm without actually speaking to my neighbours and having a community consultation."Up to four sites within his electorate have been nominated.

Electoral performance

A ReachTEL seat-level opinion poll in the safe Liberal seat of Grey of 665 voters conducted by robocall on 9 June during the 2016 election campaign surprisingly found Nick Xenophon Team candidate Andrea Broadfoot leading the Liberals' Ramsey 54–46 on the two-candidate vote. Seat-level opinion polls in the other two rural Liberal South Australian seats revealed the Nick Xenophon Team also leading in both Mayo and Barker.

Ramsey retained the seat at the 2016 election for Grey with a reduced margin of 1.95% over Broadfoot.

Notes

References

External links
Personal home page
Liberal Party biography
 

Liberal Party of Australia members of the Parliament of Australia
Members of the Australian House of Representatives
Members of the Australian House of Representatives for Grey
1956 births
Living people
21st-century Australian politicians